Bredt is a surname of German origin. Among those bearing this surname we find:

 Alice Verne-Bredt (1868-1958), English piano teacher, violinist and composer
 Bertha McNamara Bredt (1853-1931), Australian socialist agitator, feminist, pamphleteer, bookseller
 David S. Bredt (born 1964), American molecular neuroscientist
 Ferdinand Max Bredt (1868-1921), German painter 
 Irene Sänger-Bredt (1911-1983), German engineer, mathematician and physicist
 Johann Viktor Bredt (1879-1940), German Weimar era justice minister
 Julius Bredt (1855-1937), German organic chemist

Surnames of German origin
German-language surnames